Richard Collingham Wallhead (28 December 1869 – 27 April 1934), known as R. C. Wallhead, was a British Member of Parliament.

Beginning his career as a decorator, Wallhead joined the Independent Labour Party (ILP) and later became a journalist and lecturer.  A committed opponent of World War I, he was detained in 1917 under the Defence of the Realm Act.

Wallhead unsuccessfully contested Coventry in the 1918 general election for the Labour Party, to which the ILP was affiliated.  He was elected to Manchester City Council in 1919, a position he held for three years.

At the 1922 general election, Wallhead gained Merthyr from the Liberals. As the politics of the South Wales coalfield radicalised, this turned into a safe Labour seat, which he was to hold until his death.  He was one of only five ILP MPs to retain their seats in the 1931 general election, after Labour withdrew their support, and initially supported their disaffiliation from Labour.  However, in September 1933 he resigned from the ILP and rejoined Labour.  He died the following year.

His daughter Muriel Nichol was also a Labour politician, and served as MP for Bradford North from 1945 to 1950.

References
Michael Stenton and Stephen Lees, Who's Who of British MPs: Volume III, 1919-1945

1869 births
1934 deaths
Councillors in Manchester
Independent Labour Party MPs
Independent Labour Party National Administrative Committee members
Welsh Labour Party MPs
UK MPs 1922–1923
UK MPs 1923–1924
UK MPs 1924–1929
UK MPs 1929–1931
UK MPs 1931–1935
Welsh socialists
Members of the Executive of the Labour and Socialist International